The Auntie Matter is an audio drama based on the long-running British science fiction television series Doctor Who. This audio drama was produced by Big Finish Productions.

Plot 
The Doctor and Romana are hiding from the Black Guardian in 1920s London, having taken a townhouse and adopting the roles of a lord and lady while the TARDIS (containing K9) completes multiple random journeys as a diversion. When the Doctor builds a machine to detect energy signals as a warning device, he becomes aware of an alien presence in Hampshire. Meanwhile, Romana has encountered a feckless young aristocratic gentleman, Reginald, and this leads her into an encounter with the same creature, which is posing as the man's Auntie Florence, Lady Bassett. With the maid, Mabel Dobbs, in tow, the Doctor investigates and the two Time Lords must contend with murderous (but faultlessly polite) robot servants and their pitiless mistress, who preys on young women, and has Romana lined up as the next victim.

Cast 
 The Doctor – Tom Baker
 Romana I – Mary Tamm
 Aunt Florence – Julia McKenzie  
 Reggie – Robert Portal 
 Mabel Dobbs – Lucy Griffiths 
 Grenville – Alan Cox 
 Ligeia – Jane Slavin

Notes 
 This is the first of seven releases reuniting Tom Baker and Mary Tamm as the Fourth Doctor and First Romana. Tamm died in July 2012, but completed all seven productions before her death.

References

External links 
 The Auntie Matter

Fourth Doctor audio plays